Martina Thomasson (born 22 February 1985) is a Swedish racing cyclist. She competed in the 2013 UCI women's road race in Florence.

See also
 2012 Team Ibis Cycles season

References

External links

1985 births
Living people
Swedish female cyclists
Place of birth missing (living people)